Mosaic Christian Church may refer to:

 Mosaic Church
 Southeast Christian Church (Louisville, Kentucky)